Nishant Kumar (born 25 December 1988) is an Indian cricketer. He made his first-class debut on 9 December 2019, for Bihar in the 2019–20 Ranji Trophy.

References

External links
 

1988 births
Living people
Indian cricketers
Bihar cricketers
Place of birth missing (living people)